Galguduud (or Ghelgudud) is an administrative region (gobol) of Galmudug state in central Somalia. Its administrative capital is Dusmareb. The largest town in the region is Abudwak, which lies on the north-westernmost point of the region.

Galguduud is bordered by Ethiopia, the Somali regions of Mudug; Hiran, Middle Shebelle (Shabeellaha Dhexe), and the Indian Ocean.

The region of Galgaduud and southern half of Mudug formed the Galmudug State by 2016, which considers itself an autonomous state within the larger Federal Republic of Somalia, as defined by the Provisional Constitution of the Federal Republic of Somalia.

Districts
Galguduud Region consists of the following districts:

 El Bur (Ceel Buur) District
 Adado (Cadaado) District
 Dusmareb (Dhuusamarreeb) District
 Abudwak (Cabudwaaq) District
 Heraale (Heraale) District
 El Dher (Ceel Dheer) District
 Galhareeri (Galhareeri) District
 Gelinsoor (Galinsoor) District
  Balanbal
(Balanbal) District
 Jowle (Jowle) District
 Guriel (Guriceel) District
 DHabad District

Borders
Galguduud is bordered by Ethiopia or the Feerfeer-Dharkayn Geenyo Line to the west, the Somali region of Mudug to the north; Hiran and Middle Shebelle (Shabeellaha Dhexe) to the south, and the Indian Ocean to the east.

Towns and villages
 

Masagaway District

References

External links
Administrative map of Galgaduud

Galmudug
Regions of Somalia
Galguduud